The Heart of Texas Council of Governments (HOTCOG) is a voluntary association of cities, counties and special districts in Central Texas.

Based in Waco, the Heart of Texas Council of Governments is a member of the Texas Association of Regional Councils.

Counties served
Bosque
Falls
Freestone
Hill
Limestone
McLennan

Largest cities in the region
Waco
Hewitt
Bellmead
Woodway
Robinson
Marlin
Mexia
Lacy-Lakeview

References

External links
Heart of Texas Council of Governments - Official site.

Texas Association of Regional Councils
Organizations based in Waco, Texas